Zalve Parish is an administrative unit of Aizkraukle Municipality in the Selonia region of Latvia.

Towns, villages and settlements of Zalve Parish 
Cīruļkalns 
Kalnamuiža 
Pētermuiža 
Salas 
Sierotava
Smaltāni 
Sproģi 
Suseja
Vērtūži 
Zalve 
Zvanītāji 
Kalna Pālēni

Parishes of Latvia
Aizkraukle Municipality
Selonia